1990 saw many sequels and prequels in video games, such as Metal Gear 2: Solid Snake, Dr. Mario, Dragon Quest IV, Final Fantasy III, Phantasy Star II, and Super Mario World, along with new titles such as Fire Emblem: Shadow Dragon and the Blade of Light and Magic Sword. The year's highest-grossing arcade games were Final Fight in Japan and Teenage Mutant Ninja Turtles in the United States. The year's bestselling home system was the Game Boy, while the year's best-selling home video game was Super Mario Bros. 3 for the Nintendo Entertainment System.

Financial performance

Highest-grossing arcade games

Japan
In Japan, the following titles were the top ten highest-grossing arcade games of 1990.

United Kingdom and Australia
In the United Kingdom and Australia, the following titles were the top-grossing arcade games of each month.

United States
In the United States, the following titles were the highest-grossing arcade video games of 1990.

The following titles were the top-grossing arcade games on the monthly RePlay arcade charts in 1990.

Hong Kong
In Hong Kong, the following titles were the top-grossing arcade games of each month on the Bondeal charts.

Best-selling home systems

Best-selling home video games

Japan
In Japan, according to Famicom Tsūshin (Famitsu) magazine, the following titles were the top ten best-selling 1990 releases, including later sales up until 1992.

The following titles were the best-selling home video games on the Japan game charts published by Famicom Tsūshin (Famitsu) and Family Computer Magazine (Famimaga) in 1990.

United States
In the United States, Super Mario Bros. 3 was the best-selling home video game of 1990. The following titles were the best-selling home video games of each month in 1990.

United Kingdom
In the United Kingdom, the following titles were the best-selling home video games of each month in 1990, for various home computer and game console platforms.

Top-rated games

Major awards

Japan and United Kingdom

United States

Critically acclaimed titles

Famitsu Platinum Hall of Fame
The following video game releases in 1990 entered Famitsu magazine's "Platinum Hall of Fame" for receiving Famitsu scores of at least 35 out of 40.

English-language publications
Notable video game releases in 1990 that have accumulated overall critical acclaim from at least three contemporary English-language sources include:

Events
 The Consumer Electronics Show (CES) is held at the Las Vegas Convention Center in January. NEC and Sega respectively unveil prototypes for the TurboExpress and Game Gear handheld consoles, while more than 35 titles are announced for the Game Boy. Codemasters reveals an audio CD player compatible with the NES manufactured by Samsung and to be distributed by Camerica in the summer. Camerica also reveals the "Power Pak", later known as the Game Genie. Sega announces that 20 third-party titles would be released for the Sega Genesis by the end of 1990, as well as the continued development for Master System games.
 David Pomije establishes the first FuncoLand location in New Hope, Minnesota in August.
August – Publication of Swedish language video game magazine Nintendomagasinet begins.
March 8 – the Nintendo World Championships begins.
Nintendo v. Color Dreams lawsuit: Nintendo sues Color Dreams over unlicensed production of Nintendo video games.
Toy Headquarters merges with Trinity Acquisition Corporation forming THQ.
New companies: Eidos, Interactive Studios, Team17, Natsume, Revolution Software
Defunct: Tynesoft

Hardware releases
Camerica releases Codemasters' Game Genie adapter in Canada and the UK (In the US, it was released by Galoob).
NEC releases the TurboExpress handheld console.
Nintendo releases the Super Famicom 16-bit console in Japan.
SNK releases the Neo Geo Advanced Entertainment System (AES) home console.
September 28 – Nintendo releases the Game Boy across Europe. It became a huge success and a wide phenomenon over the continent, particularly in Germany and the UK.
October 6 – Sega's Game Gear color handheld is released in Japan. It is launched in North America in 1991 and Europe and Australia in 1992.
November 30 – Sega's Mega Drive released in Europe.
Amstrad halts production of the ZX Spectrum, ending that platform's 8-year dominance of the UK home computer market.
Amstrad introduces its only console, the Amstrad GX4000, which fails to garner interest and is discontinued the following year.

Game releases
Bonk's Adventure is released for NEC's TurboGrafx-16 and is the first US appearance of Bonk, the mascot of the TurboGrafx-16.
Namco releases Kyuukai Douchuuki, World Stadium '90, Final Lap 2, Pistol Daimyo no Bouken, which is a spin-off from Berabow Man, Souko Ban Deluxe, Dragon Saber, Rolling Thunder 2, Steel Gunner and Golly! Ghost!.
February 12 – Nintendo releases the NES game Super Mario Bros. 3 in North America. It sells 17.28 million copies, making it one of the best-selling stand-alone video games of all time.
April – Konami releases Snake's Revenge, a sequel to Metal Gear for the Nintendo Entertainment System in North America, developed without the involvement of Hideo Kojima.
April – Williams releases Smash TV in arcades, a twin-stick shooter about an ultra-violent game show.
April 20 – Nintendo releases Fire Emblem: Shadow Dragon and the Blade of Light in Japan, innovating the tactical role-playing genre.
 June 1 – Origin releases Ultima VI: The False Prophet
July 12 – Nintendo of America publishes Final Fantasy for the Nintendo Entertainment System in North America. This game started Square's popular and long-running Final Fantasy series.
 July 20 – Metal Gear 2: Solid Snake for the MSX2 computer, is released exclusively in Japan. It is Konamis last major game for the hardware.
 July 27– Nintendo releases Dr. Mario for 3 Nintendo platforms.
 August – Pit Fighter from Atari Games introduces digitized sprites to arcade fighting games.
September – Broderbund releases a port of Prince of Persia for the MS-DOS computers.
 September 26 – Origin releases the first Wing Commander game.
 September 28 – Capcom releases Mega Man 3 for NES in Japan, introducing the characters Rush and Proto Man, Mega Man's slide is introduced, and Capcom's character cameos.
November 9 – Sierra On-Line releases King's Quest V.
October 15 – LucasArts releases The Secret of Monkey Island
November 1 – Mega Man 3 is released in the US.
November 21 – Nintendo releases Super Mario World and F-Zero in Japan as launch titles for the Super Famicom. Super Mario World introduced Yoshi and F-Zero introduced Captain Falcon.
December 14 – Commander Keen is released as shareware, the first major platformer on a PC.
Sega releases the G-LOC: Air Battle R-360 arcade game, featuring the first 3D – 360° gameplay that physically rotated the real world player.
Sid Meier's Railroad Tycoon, the first of the "Tycoon" games, is released by MicroProse.
Infogrames releases Alpha Waves, the first 3D platform game.
 Mindscape publishes Captive.
 Konami releases Teenage Mutant Ninja Turtles The Arcade Game, on the Nintendo Entertainment System.

See also
1990 in games

References

 
Video games by year